Kapunda is a town and locality in South Australia.

Kapunda may refer to. 
 
Kapunda Football Club , an Australian rules football team in South Australia
Hundred of Kapunda, a cadastral unit in South Australia
District Council of Kapunda, former local government area in South Australia, merged to form what is now the Light Regional Council
Kapunda (ship), a sailing ship
Kapunda (insect): a genus of shield bugs in the tribe Sciocorini
HMAS Kapunda, a  Bathurst-class corvette

See also
Kapunda Island Conservation Park
Kapunda Road Royal Commission
The Kapunda Herald